Svetolik Skale Mitić (May 23, 1923 – April 1, 2008) was a Serbian poet, writer and film director, as well as the author of numerous books and film scripts.

Early life 
He was born in Kruševac, Serbia, Yugoslavia.

Works 
He is best known for Covek zvani vazduh (1983), Praznik pobede (1947), Jugoslovenska porodica (1984), Link (1930), and Godina (1996). In 1948 he began presenting cinema news in documentary films.

In 1958 he took part in the first experimental TV programs on Yugoslavian TV. Subsequently, he directed and wrote for popular TV shows. A close friend of Josip Broz Tito. He spent several years as the prisinoner of a guerilla group in Nicaragua during the Nicaraguan Revolution.

Death 
Svetolik Skale Mitić died on April 1, 2008 in Belgrade Serbia. He was buried on the New Cemetery in Belgrade. Serbia honors memory of Svetolik Skale Mitić.

References 

1923 births
2008 deaths
20th-century Serbian poets
Serbian screenwriters
Male screenwriters
Serbian film directors
20th-century Serbian writers
Serbian television directors
Writers from Kruševac
20th-century screenwriters
Yugoslav poets